Gary Gill is a former politician from Honolulu, Hawaii. He was a member of the Honolulu City Council between 1987 and 1994, representing Downtown Honolulu's District 6. Gill served as Chair of the Council from October 10, 1992 until July 18, 1994, when he resigned from council to run for Mayor of Honolulu, losing to incumbent mayor Jeremy Harris.

Career
In 2013, Gill was named interim director of the Hawaii Department of Health after the unexpected passing of director Loretta Fuddy. He had previously served as deputy health director for the environment.

Outside of government, Gill has worked as development director for the Hawaii Sierra Club, program manager for Kokua Kalihi Valley community health clinic, executive director of Waimea Valley on Oahu's North Shore, and program director for Blue Planet Foundation of Hawaii.

Personal life
Gill is the son of former Hawaii congressman and lieutenant governor Thomas Gill and nephew of Lorin Tarr Gill, founder of the Hawaii Chapter of the Sierra Club.

References

Further reading
Gary Gill - MidWeek Printing, May 11, 2005

External links
Profile at Clean Technology and Sustainable Industries Organization
Council Members of the Honolulu City Council

Year of birth missing (living people)
Living people
Honolulu City Council members